Proto-religion may refer to:

Religion 
Urreligion, a notion of an "original" or "oldest" form of religious tradition
Early stages in the  origin of religion in the course of human evolution
Paleolithic religion, spiritual beliefs thought to have appeared during the Paleolithic time period

Reconstructed proto-religion
Proto-Indo-European religion, belief system adhered to by the Proto-Indo-Europeans
Proto-Semitic religion, polytheistic religions of the Semitic peoples